Western Maryland College Historic District is a national historic district at Westminster, Carroll County, Maryland, United States.  It is situated within the confines of the present 100-plus acre college campus of McDaniel College and comprises an area of about three acres at its southeast corner.  It includes six of the college's earliest surviving buildings and structures: Alumni Hall, Carroll Hall, Levine Hall, The President's House, Little Baker Chapel, and the Ward Memorial Arch.  These structures are the oldest surviving architectural links with the 19th century beginnings of the college.

It was added to the National Register of Historic Places in 1976.

References

External links

, including photo from 1975, at Maryland Historical Trust

Historic districts in Carroll County, Maryland
Historic districts on the National Register of Historic Places in Maryland
McDaniel College
University and college buildings on the National Register of Historic Places in Maryland
Gothic Revival architecture in Maryland
Romanesque Revival architecture in Maryland
Colonial Revival architecture in Maryland
National Register of Historic Places in Carroll County, Maryland